Ignacio Paniagua (born September 20, 1979 in Ybycuí, Paraguay) is a Paraguayan footballer currently playing for Fernando de la Mora of the División Intermedia in Paraguay.

Teams
  Deportivo Recoleta 1997-1998
  Guaraní 1999
  3 de Febrero 2000-2001
  Deportivo Recoleta 2002
  General Caballero 2003
  Sport Colombia 2004
  Tacuary 2005
  Nacional 2006
  Tacuary 2006-2007
  Sportivo Luqueño 2008
  Tacuary 2009-2010
  Fernando de la Mora 2011–present

References
 
 

1975 births
Living people
Paraguayan footballers
Paraguayan expatriate footballers
Sportivo Luqueño players
Club Guaraní players
Club Tacuary footballers
Club Atlético 3 de Febrero players
Sport Colombia footballers
General Caballero Sport Club footballers
Club Nacional de Football players
Expatriate footballers in Uruguay
Association football defenders